Maine elected its members September 13, 1824.  Maine law required a majority vote for election, necessitating additional ballots in the 3rd and 4th districts on January 3, 1825, April 4, 1825, and September 12, 1825.

See also 
 List of United States representatives from Maine

Notes 

United States House of Representatives elections in Maine
Maine
Maine
United States House of Representatives
United States House of Representatives